Metulje is a small village south of Nova Vas in the Municipality of Bloke in the Inner Carniola region of Slovenia.

The local church in the settlement is dedicated to Saint Anthony of Padua and belongs to the Parish of Bloke.

References

External links
Metulje on Geopedia

Populated places in the Municipality of Bloke